Ham Polo Club is a Hurlingham Polo Association polo club situated in Richmond in the London Borough of Richmond upon Thames, south-west London, England. It is one of the oldest polo clubs in the United Kingdom and the last surviving club in London. The club occupies a location between Richmond Park and the River Thames overlooked by Ham House, eight miles from Hyde Park Corner. The club's facilities include three polo fields (two boarded), a stick and ball field, an exercise track, livery service, coaching and a members' clubhouse with a restaurant and bar which is managed by Blue Strawberry Group. Polo is played at Ham Polo Club between May and September. The club has around 70 playing members and several hundred social members.

History
Ham Polo Club is the last remaining of the many clubs that existed as satellites to London's 'Big Three' – Ranelagh, Hurlingham and Roehampton. The club began life as the Ham Common Polo Club in 1926, with one full sized ground and two smaller rounds. The first ground was next door to Brown Gates House, Church Road, Ham Common, home of the first chairman, Loftus Storey.

The full-sized ground lay between Richmond Gates and Sheen and a regular coach there was Johnny Traill, the first Argentine 10 goaler, who lived at nearby Roehampton. Ham Common Polo Club, together with Stoke d'Abernon and clubs such as Worcester Park, Kingsbury and Crystal Palace, was ideal for Londoners who did not compete in the major tournaments at the 'Big Three' but who played for the fun of the game. The 1939 season was necessarily the last for the next six years.

Ham was revived in 1946 largely by the efforts of William "Billy" Francis Walsh (1907–1992). On returning from service in the Army, Walsh found that Captain Tom Brigg, the owner of the stables where he had worked, had died and the stables were on the market. Using his gratuity Walsh bought the stables and began offering a livery service to club members. Loftus Storey returned as club Chairman, formed a committee, appointed Billy as Polo Manager and Ham Polo Club was revived under HPA rules. It is widely believed that Lord Cowdray, Arthur Lucas and Billy Walsh were the trio who rescued polo in the United Kingdom after the war. 

The first post-war English polo tournament was held at Roehampton in 1947 and the Ham Polo Club team carried off the premier trophy the Roehampton Cup (now played for at Ham). Three years later the club began using a field adjacent to Ham House for matches. Then in 1954, George Stevens, The Dysart families' tenant at Ham House Farm' agreed to turn the Ham House orchard into a polo field for the club.

The first president of the club was Major Archie David the patron of the Friars Park team. The Autumn cup which he presented is still played for annually at Ham. Johnny Traill became a familiar figure at the club and Edward Tauchert Rescued the Roehampton Trophy from the Roehampton Golf Club.

In 1970, thanks largely to the efforts of the then President Sir David Brown, the club purchased the freehold of the land. Sixteen years later land adjacent was purchased and the club gained another ground. In 1982, at the age of seventy, Billy Walsh retired as manager of the club to become President. He was succeeded by two further generations managing Ham Polo Club, Peggy, his daughter and Tim, his grandson.

The club continues to play polo between May and September, managed by Marcus Hancock. The current President is Col. Geoffrey Godbold OBE TD DL. The club's Chairman is Howard Davis.

Flagship tournaments
A number of tournaments run throughout the season at Ham Polo Club. The flagship tournaments are the Summer tournament (0–4 goal), The Roehampton Trophy (6 goal) and the Billy Walsh Tournament (0–2 goal).

Membership
The number of playing members is limited and applicants must  be interviewed by the committee. Social membership entitles individuals or families to use the clubhouse facilities on match days as well as being invited to the club's social functions. Academy membership is also available and a Junior category for young players.

Charity

Ham Polo Club has helped raise almost £2 million for charity over the last few years. Several main charitable events are run each year.

ChildLine Sundown Polo Challenge
On a Saturday evening in June each year a polo match, dinner and charity auction is held to raise funds for the ChildLine organisation. Patron of the charity Esther Rantzen is always present alongside a host of celebrity guests.

Laureus Sport for Good Foundation
The Laureus Sport for Good Foundation works with millions of underprivileged children worldwide. An event takes place annually, this year a number of Laureus ambassadors were in attendance including Edwin Moses, Hugo Porta, Sean Fitzpatrick, Daley Thompson and Boris Becker.

Chakravarty Cup
For many years the Chakravarty cup was held at Ham Polo Club. The event, started in 1997, raises funds for the charities and foundations supported by The Royal Family. The Prince of Wales took part in the match for nine years; now he has retired, his sons The Duke of Cambridge and The Duke of Sussex take part.

Notable members
Elle Macpherson, Australian model, businesswoman, television host and actress
Ali Albwardy, patron of the Dubai Polo Team
Adolfo Cambiaso, 10-goal professional polo player
Lolo Castagnola, 9-goal professional polo player

Chairmen
Loftus Storey 1937–1938
Polo ceased during World War II 1939–1945
Loftus Storey 1947–1950
Major S.C. Deed 1950–1954
Edward Tauchert 1955–56
C.J. Busby 1957–1965
R.W.Addie 1966
C.J. Busby 1967
C.J.Harrison 1968–1971
Col Gerald Critchley 1972–1979
P.Adams/G.Godbold 1979–1984
G.E.Godbold OBE TD 1979–1995
N.Colquhoun-Denvers 1995–2018
H. Davis 2018–

Presidents
Major Archie David 1957–1970
Sir David Brown 1971–1979
Doug Riley-Smith 1980
post vacant 1981–1982
Geoffrey Lawson 1983–1986
Billy Walsh 1987–1992
Bryan Morrison 1993–1996
Douglas Brown DFC 1997–2000
J.W.M. (Buff) Crisp 2001–2003
Saeed Ali Albwardy 2004–2007
Vichai Raksriaksorn 2008–2012
Steven Lamprell 2013–2016
Mohammed S Almarzooqi 2017–2020
Col. Geoffrey Godbold OBE TD DL 2021-

Polo managers
Billy Walsh 1946–1986
Peggy Healy 1987–2000
Tim Healy 2001
James Lange 2002–2003
Tom Benson 2004–2005
David Leach 2006
Daniel Devrient Kidd 2007
Adolfo Casabal 2008–2011
William Healy 2011–2021
Gaston Devrient 2022- January–June
Lucy Dowie/Manuel Perez (Joint Interim) 2022- June–September
Marcus Hancock 2022 -

Trophies

 
 Annie's Trophy
 Anthony Cup Trophy
Ascott Cup
 Asprey Red Cross Trophy
Autumn Cup
Aylesford Trophy
Bannister Bowl
BBVA Bowl
Best of Richmond
Boisdale Social
Candilio Cup
Chairman"s Trophy
 Childline Trophy
Childline Champagne
Committee Crystal
Crescent Oil Trophy
The Gerald Critchley Trophy
David Brown Trophy
David Healy
 Don Zoilo
 Double Bett Trophy
Doug Brown Plate
Dubai Desert Palm
Dubai Desert Palm II
FAL Energy
Farewell Cup
Floating Seat
 Ghana Airways Trophy
Goal Cup
Godbold Trophy
Ham Cup
Ham Mini
 Hine Cognac Trophy
 HR Owen Trophy
 Hunt Kendall
 Indian Army Trophy
Jimmy Edwards
 J & S Franklin Trophy
 June Bamberg Trophy
Kingfisher Trophy
King Power Charity
 Newport Cup Trophy
 No Name Cup
Peter Pitts Trophy
Peter Pitts II
Petersham Bowl
 Player of the Year Trophy
Polo Challenge
Quatros Amigos
Red Cross
Rerrieson
 Richmond Park Cup
 Roehampton Trophy
 Rosie Adams Bowl
Siam Trophy
 Sladmore Trophy
Social Trophy
Social Committee
 Stagshead Trophy
 Tauchert Bowl Trophy
 Thailand Trophy
 Tiger Mountain
 Tiger Mountain 2 Trophy
 Tiger Mountain PanAm Trophy
 Tigerstream 1 Trophy
 Tigerstream II Trophy
Tiger Tops
Tournament Cup
Umpire's Millennium
 Ventura Pauly Trophy
Visitors' Trophy
 Walsh Challenge
Anglo-German
Lufthansa Best Player
Orthoceras Belemnite

References

External links

Ham Polo Club Blog – News and Reviews of matches and tournaments at Ham Polo Club
Flickr – Images of Ham Polo Club
YouTube – Videos of Ham Polo Club
Wikimedia Commons

1926 establishments in England
1926 in London
History of the London Borough of Richmond upon Thames
Polo clubs in the United Kingdom
Richmond, London
Sport in the London Borough of Richmond upon Thames
Sports clubs established in 1926
Sports clubs in London
Sports venues in London
Tourist attractions in the London Borough of Richmond upon Thames
Buildings and structures on the River Thames